Scissor macrocephalus is a species of characin endemic to Suriname.  It is the only member of its genus.

References
 

Characidae

Fish of South America
Endemic fauna of Suriname
Fish described in 1864
Taxa named by Albert Günther